Frantz is a 2016 drama film directed and co-written by François Ozon and starring Paula Beer and Pierre Niney. It is about a young German woman whose fiancé has been killed in World War I and the French soldier who comes bearing a secret about her fiancé. It was selected to compete for the Golden Lion at the 73rd Venice International Film Festival, where Beer won the Marcello Mastroianni Award. At the 42nd César Awards, Frantz was nominated in eleven categories, winning one for Best Cinematography.

Frantz is a loose adaptation of the 1932 Ernst Lubitsch film Broken Lullaby,  which in turn was based on Maurice Rostand's 1930 French play L'homme que j'ai tué.

Plot
In Quedlinburg, Germany, in 1919, Anna, a young German woman (Paula Beer) grieving over the death of her fiancé, Frantz Hoffmeister, in World War I, leaves flowers at his grave. She sees there fresh ones and realizes that these are from Adrien (Pierre Niney), a young Frenchman, she doesn't know. Adrien goes to the home of Frantz's parents, Dr. Hans and Magda Hoffmeister, but when Hans hears that Adrien is French, he tells him that a Frenchman killed his son, blames all French as murderers, and orders Adrien away. To which Adrien merely admits to Hans "You are right. I am a murderer".

Meanwhile, Anna is rejecting the unwelcome advances of an older suitor Mr. Kreutz, particularly as she cannot forget Frantz. Anna sees Adrien at the grave and sends him an invitation to the Hoffmeister home. After she tells the Hoffmeisters that Adrien was leaving flowers at Frantz's grave, they relent. Adrien visits and, upon questioning, tell them that he and Frantz were students together in Paris before the war. He recounts their last day together, when they visited the Louvre. Anna takes Adrien to the places she and Frantz used to go together, including the mountaintop where he proposed to her. Adrien, whose demeanour reminds them of Frantz, lifts Anna and the Hoffmeisters out of their despair. The Hoffmeisters ask Adrien, who had been a violinist, but whose hearing was damaged in the war, to play Frantz's violin for them, as Frantz used to do. Adrien asks Anna to go to the local ball with him and she accepts. The appearance of a Frenchman at the ball draws negative reactions from the locals, especially Kreutz.

Increasingly unable to maintain the lie, Adrien confesses to Anna that he lied about being Frantz's friend in Paris before the war. Actually, they met as enemy soldiers on the battlefield, face to face in a trench where Adrien killed Frantz. Frantz was a pacifist and his gun was unloaded. Adrien found Frantz's last letter to Anna on his body and, racked with guilt, resolved to visit Germany in order to seek forgiveness. Anna, heartbroken, says that she will tell the Hoffmeisters so that Adrien does not. In reality, however, she decides that it is better for them to remain in ignorance of Adrien's role after they have come to like him and see him as a connection to their lost son. Adrien returns to Paris and Anna sinks back into despair, attempting to drown herself. She does not reply to Adrien's letters and destroys one he enclosed for the Hoffmeisters confessing his true role. After being nursed back to health by the Hoffmeisters, Anna's spirits gradually recover and she decides to contact Adrien again. When Anna sends him a letter several months later, it is returned with no forwarding address.

Magda Hoffmeister, who had encouraged a romance between Anna and Adrien, encourages her to go to Paris to find him. Anna eventually tracks down Adrien at his mother's estate and forgives him, though he says he will never forgive himself. She also discovers that Adrien is about to enter an arranged marriage with a childhood friend, Fanny. Anna realises that the romance she had imagined developing between her and Adrien had all been in her head; all he had wanted from her was forgiveness. She kisses Adrien goodbye at the railway station and leaves. She continues writing to the Hoffmeisters as if she and Adrien are now together. In reality, she is living her own life in Paris, having finally started living again following Frantz's death, as Frantz said she should in his last letter to her.

Cast

Reception

Critical response
Frantz received generally positive reviews from critics. Ty Burr of The Boston Globe said, "Frantz is pleasurable slow going, developing its themes at an amble but with a measure of suspense, sympathy toward its characters, and a lasting faith in filmmaking craft." Peter Travers of Rolling Stone also gave praise, stating that "Francois Ozon's post-WW1 period piece about a German widow and a French soldier takes on xenophobic hatred that's as timely as Trump, making Frantz a film of its time ... and ours."

AlloCiné, a French cinema website, gave the film an average of 3.7/5, based on a survey of 33 reviews, indicating "generally favorable reviews". On review aggregator Rotten Tomatoes, the film holds a 91% approval rating based on 135 reviews, with an average rating of 7.4/10. The website's critical consensus states: "Frantz finds writer-director François Ozon thoughtfully probing the aftermath of World War I through the memories and relationships of loved ones left behind." At Metacritic, which assigns a rating out of 100 to reviews from mainstream critics, the film received a score of 73 out of 100, based on 28 critics, indicating "generally favorable reviews".

Accolades

Trivia
Édouard Manet's painting Le Suicidé is referenced and shown several times in the story.

References

External links
 

2016 films
2016 drama films
2010s French-language films
French drama films
French black-and-white films
French remakes of American films
German drama films
German black-and-white films
Films directed by François Ozon
Films with screenplays by François Ozon
2010s French films
2010s German films